Damien O'Kane (born 1 September 1978) is an Irish musician, born in Coleraine. He lives in Yorkshire with his wife, musician Kate Rusby, and their two daughters.

Career
O'Kane graduated from Newcastle University in 2005 and has been performing ever since. He has performed with Flook and also in a duo with Shona Kipling. Damien is now pursuing his own solo career and also tours with Kate Rusby. His solo work features songs from his native Northern Ireland as well as his trademark instrumentals.

Personal life
Damien is married to singer/songwriter Kate Rusby; the couple have two daughters.

Discography
 Banjophony, 2018 (with Ron Block)
 While Mortals Sleep, 2011 (with Kate Rusby)
 Make the Light, 2010 (with Rusby)
 Sweet Bells, 2008 (with Rusby; PRCD33)
 Haven, 2006 (Flook)
 Box On, 2006 (Shona Kipling + O'Kane)
 Momentum, 2005 (CrossCurrent)
 Melodeon Crimes, 2005 (Julian Sutton instrumental album)
 Pure Chance, 2003 (Shona Kipling + O'Kane)

Solo albums
 Summer Hill (2010, Pure Records)
 Areas of High Traffic (2016, Pure Records)
 Avenging and Bright (2017, Pure Records)

References

External links
 Damien O'Kane Home Page

1978 births
Banjoists from Northern Ireland
Living people
Alumni of Newcastle University
Musicians from County Londonderry
People from Coleraine, County Londonderry
Flook (band) members